The following ships of the Indian Navy have been named INS Nilgiri:

  was a  launched in 1968 and expended as a target in 1997
  is a  launched in 2019

Indian Navy ship names